Anand Bhate (born 29 April 1971) is an Indian classical vocalist from the Kirana gharana. He is popular for his classical singing of songs from the Marathi film Balgandharva (2011).

Early life and training
Anand was born in Pune, India in 1971, in a family active in classical music. He inherited the singing tradition from his great grandfather Bhate Buva, who was a well known vocalist for Thumri and Natya Sangeet in the 19th century. By the age of 10, he had started systematic training in classical singing from Chandrashekhar Deshpande, after which he trained under Yashwantbua Marathe and with Bhimsen Joshi, with whom he trained for 15 years.

Career
His first public appearance was as a child in 1981, when he performed Balgandharva's gayaki on All India Radio, Doordarshan and had a tour in the USA. Over the years, he has performed all over India and abroad in many prestigious music festivals such as the Sawai Gandharva Sangeet Mahotsav, Pandit Jitendra Abhisheki Sangeet Samaroha, Chaturang Pratishthan Rangsammelan and Learn quest Music Conference.

Bhate won the National Film Award for Best Male Playback Singer for the 2011 Marathi movie on the life of the Marathi stage actor/singer Balgandharva

Awards and achievements
 Honoured with the title "Anand Gandharva" in 1981 at the age of 10
 Released an album of Natyasangeet in 1983
 Swaryogini Dr. Prabha Atre award from Gaanvardhan & Tatyasaheb Natu foundation Pune, for his significant achievements and performing career.
 Balgandharva Gunagaurav Puraskar by Balgandharva Sangeet Rasik Mandal
 Pandit Ramkrishnabua Vaze Young Artiste Award in 2006
 Dr. Prabha Atre Puraskar, by Ganawardhan, Pune in 2012
 National Film Award for Best Male Playback Singer for Balgandharva
 Balagandharva Puraskar by Akhil Bharatiya Natya Parishad, Mumbai in 2012
 Maharashtra State award
 Zee award
 MIFTA award

References

External links
 Anand Bhate, official website

21st-century Indian male classical singers
1971 births
Living people
Savitribai Phule Pune University alumni
Hindustani singers
Kirana gharana
Singers from Pune
20th-century Indian male classical singers
Best Male Playback Singer National Film Award winners
Indian male playback singers